Jean Jenkins may refer to:

 Jean Jenkins (politician) (born 1938), Australian educator and senator for Western Australia
 Jean Jenkins (ethnomusicologist) (1922–1990), American-born ethnomusicologist